One Eye or One-Eye may refer to:

 One Eye Peak, British Columbia, Canada
 One Eye Lake, British Columbia
 One Eye River, Jamaica
 A character in the German fairy tale "One-Eye, Two-Eyes, and Three-Eyes"
 A character in the 2003 horror film Wrong Turn
 A character in the 2009 film Valhalla Rising

See also
 List of people known as the One-Eyed
 List of one-eyed creatures in mythology and fiction